The 1966–67 NCAA College Division men's ice hockey season began in November 1966 and concluded in March of the following year. This was the 3rd season of second-tier college ice hockey.

ECAC 2 added Boston State who was an NAIA school. Normally the conference would be forbidden to add a non-NCAA school as a member but because there was no national tournament for College Division schools no penalty was imposed.

Regular season

Season tournaments

Standings

See also
 1966–67 NCAA University Division men's ice hockey season

References

External links

 
NCAA